Astrothelium pseudodissimulum is a species of corticolous (bark-dwelling), crustose lichen in the family Trypetheliaceae. Found in Papua New Guinea, it was formally described as a new species in 2016 by Dutch lichenologist André Aptroot. The lichen has a smooth, pale yellowish-green thallus with a cortex but lacking a prothallus. The only lichen product detected in collected samples of the lichen using thin-layer chromatography was an anthraquinone. The combination of characteristics of the lichen that distinguish it from others in Astrothelium are its inspersed ; pigment in the medulla that reacts K+ (red); and the pseudostromatic form of the ascomata, with whitish-coloured,  to prominent pseudostromata.

References

pseudodissimulum
Lichen species
Lichens described in 2016
Lichens of New Guinea
Taxa named by André Aptroot